Paulnita Marais (born 27 September) is a South African politician who has been a member of the National Assembly of South Africa since January 2022, representing the Economic Freedom Fighters (EFF) party. She is a former Metro Councillor of the Mangaung Metropolitan Municipality.

Biography
Marais was born in Cape Town on 27 September. She studied at the University of Cape Town. She was the manager of VeriCred Credit Bureau -Pty Ltd. Marais was married to the late ANC senator who later became an Economic Freedom Fighters (EFF) member, Anthony Tony Marais. Anthony died in January 2019 in Heidedal, Bloemfontein where he had lived with Paulnita and their children.

In 2016, Marais was elected as an EFF councillor of the Mangaung Metropolitan Municipality. She served as leader of the EFF caucus in the metro during her tenure as a councillor. In January 2020, Marais said that the metro's members of the mayoral committee (MMCs) should be held accountable for the metro's problems. Marais accused the ANC's mayoral candidate Mxolisi Siyonzana of being part of divisions in the ANC caucus in August 2021.

On 26 January 2022, Marais was sworn in as a Member of the National Assembly of South Africa.

References

External links

Year of birth missing (living people)
People from Cape Town
Coloured South African people
Members of the National Assembly of South Africa
Economic Freedom Fighters politicians
21st-century South African women politicians
21st-century South African politicians
Living people